Waimate is a town in Canterbury, New Zealand and the seat of Waimate District. It is situated just inland from the eastern coast of the South Island.  The town is reached via a short detour west when travelling on State Highway One, the main North/South road. Waimate is 45.7 km south of Timaru, Canterbury's second city, 20 km north of the Waitaki River, which forms the border between Canterbury and the Otago province to the south and 47.5 km north of Oamaru, the main town of the Waitaki District.

Waimate is well known for its population of Bennett's wallabies. These marsupials were introduced from Australia and now live wild in the countryside surrounding the town. It is also recognised for the White Horse Monument which is a silhouette of a white horse that can be seen on the hills behind the town. It commemorates the Clydesdale horses that helped breaking in the land in earlier days. Visitors to the monument's lookout are rewarded with panoramic views of the town and the district's green plains out towards the Pacific Ocean.

History 
From 1877 until 1966, Waimate was served by the Waimate Branch, a branch line railway that connected with the Main South Line some seven kilometres east in Studholme. For roughly seventy years ending in 1953, the line ran beyond Waimate to Waihao Downs.  When the branch line was closed on 31 March 1966, Waimate became the first major town in New Zealand to lose its railway connection.

Geography 
The Waimate District is bounded by the Waitaki River in the south, the Pareora River in the north and the Hakataramea Valley to the west.  The district is a very productive agricultural area with a mix of pastoral, cropping, dairy farming, fruit and vegetable growing.

The Waihao River, which starts in the Hunter Hills catchment area runs eastwards on the southern side of the Waimate township joining with the Waimate Creek. They both eventually end up discharging very close to the sea into the Wainono Dead Arm, which then flows into the Wainono Lagoon near Studholme.

Demographics

Waimate had a population of 3,456 at the 2018 New Zealand census, an increase of 171 people (5.2%) since the 2013 census, and an increase of 168 people (5.1%) since the 2006 census. There were 1,602 households. There were 1,638 males and 1,815 females, giving a sex ratio of 0.9 males per female, with 474 people (13.7%) aged under 15 years, 465 (13.5%) aged 15 to 29, 1,374 (39.8%) aged 30 to 64, and 1,143 (33.1%) aged 65 or older.

Ethnicities were 94.4% European/Pākehā, 7.6% Māori, 0.8% Pacific peoples, 1.7% Asian, and 1.5% other ethnicities (totals add to more than 100% since people could identify with multiple ethnicities).

The proportion of people born overseas was 12.0%, compared with 27.1% nationally.

Although some people objected to giving their religion, 49.0% had no religion, 37.8% were Christian, 0.3% were Buddhist and 2.6% had other religions.

Of those at least 15 years old, 243 (8.1%) people had a bachelor or higher degree, and 1,005 (33.7%) people had no formal qualifications. 213 people (7.1%) earned over $70,000 compared to 17.2% nationally. The employment status of those at least 15 was that 1,056 (35.4%) people were employed full-time, 405 (13.6%) were part-time, and 99 (3.3%) were unemployed.

Nearby communities 
Glenavy
Hook
Hunter
Ikawai
Makikihi
Morven
Otaio
Saint Andrews
Studholme
Waihao Downs
Waihaorunga
Waituna

Economy 
Like much of rural New Zealand, Waimate suffered from an economic downturn in the 1980s, with the closure of the dairy factory and a number of sawmills. For the last decade of the 20th century the biggest employers in the district were two furniture manufacturers, a vegetable processing plant and a factory making French fries and other potato products at Makikihi. All but the latter closed within the first few years of the 21st century. However, a newly developed large scale sawmill and the development of a large milk powder factory, coupled with the wealth of dairy farms and the nationwide real estate bubble of 2003–2007, saw a renewed confidence in Waimate.

Education 
Further Information: List of schools in Canterbury, New Zealand#Waimate District

Waimate Main opened in 1867 as Waimate Primary. Waimate Centennial opened in 1955 and catered for years 1 to 8 until 1982, when it reduced to years 1 to 6.

Waituna Creek School is a rural full primary about 6 kilometres northwest of Waimate. It was established in 1879.

St Patrick's School is a Catholic state-integrated full primary for years 1 to 8 with a roll of  students. The school website says it was first opened in the late 1880s, and the school celebrated 125 years of Catholic education in Waimate in 2005. The New Zealand Tablet reported that St Patrick's School opened during 1881.

Waimate High School is a secondary school for years 7 to 13 with a roll of  students. Waimate District High School opened in 1883. It became Waimate High on a new site in 1929, and in 1982 it expanded to also take year 7 and 8 students.

Notable people from Waimate 
Eric Batchelor, a decorated Commonwealth NCO who served in World War II
Ken Catran, novelist and screenwriter
Margaret Cruickshank (1873–1918), the second woman to graduate in medicine in New Zealand and the first New Zealand woman to register and practise as a general practitioner. Although not born in Waimate, she spent her professional career there and her achievement is celebrated with a monument of her in the middle of the township.
Mary Gorman, World War I nurse who died in the sinking of the SS Marquette
A. M. Hamilton, notable for building the Hamilton Road through Kurdistan and designing the Callender-Hamilton bridge system
Major General Howard Kippenberger, officer commanding New Zealand forces in North Africa during World War II. Though not born in Waimate, his father bought a farm there when he was young and he spent much of his early childhood there
Norman Kirk, 29th Prime Minister of New Zealand, 1972–1974
Neill Rattray (1896–1964), farmer, war veteran, and member of the New Zealand Legislative Council
Jim Sheddan (1918–2010), flying ace of the Royal New Zealand Air Force during the Second World War
Michael Studholme, the first European settler in the region
Sir William Maxwell Manchester (1913–2001), founding plastic surgeon at Middlemore Hospital, Auckland in 1950
Kaylee Bell, New Zealand country singer-songwriter.

Notable places 

A statue of Zealandia, a female allegorical representation of New Zealand similar to Great Britain's Britannia, is located just off the main street. Only three Zealandia statues exist in the whole country, the one at Waimate, one at Palmerston in Otago, and another in Auckland. The Waimate and Palmerston statues were erected as Boer War memorials, and the one in Auckland to commemorate troops who fought against Māori in the New Zealand Wars.

St Patrick's Basilica Catholic Church, located on Timaru Rd, was designed in 1908 by Francis Petre and is considered his most original design. St. Augustine's Anglican Church, located on John Street in Waimate, designed in 1872 by Benjamin Mountfort.

Waihao marae, a marae (tribal meeting ground) of Ngāi Tahu and its Te Rūnanga o Waihao branch, is located in the Waimate district. It includes Centennial Memorial Hall, a wharenui (traditional meeting house).

Waimate Museum, located in Shearman St, was designed in 1878 by P.M.F. Burrows. Arcadia Theatre was originally built as Quinn's Arcade in 1906. Waimate White Horse is also located in the town.

Sport

Rugby 
 Waimate Rugby Football Club has teams competing in the South Canterbury rugby competitions. The club is affiliated with the South Canterbury Rugby Football Union.

Golf 
 Waimate Golf Club

Events 
 March Hare Motorcycle Rally, Annually, first weekend of March
 Waimate 50 Street Race, October
 Waimate Strawberry Fare Annual second weekend in December
Waimate Shears October
 Waimate Rodeo, Annually 27 December
 Claytons Debating Tournament, Annually in July–August
 Waimate Museum Bookarama, Annually at Labour Weekend
  Waimate Edwardian Heritage Celebrations Annually second weekend in March

Movies and film 
 The Waimate Conspiracy (2006) was filmed in Waimate.

Sister cities 
 Bourail, France
 Milton-Freewater, USA

References

External links

Explore Waimate Waimate District's promotional website.
An Encyclopedia of New Zealand 1966: Waimate
Unofficial Waimate site – pictures and links.
Waimate High School 1929–1954

 
Waimate District
Populated places in Canterbury, New Zealand